Mifflin v. Dutton, 190 U.S. 265 (1903), was a United States Supreme Court case in which the Court held that the authorized appearance of a work in a magazine without a copyright notice specifically dedicated to that work transfers that work into the public domain.

Background 
The case concerned the publication of The Minister's Wooing by Harriet Beecher Stowe, published chapter-by-chapter in Atlantic Monthly before and after a copyright filing, and never with the required notice in the magazine. Following the serialization, Houghton, Mifflin & Co. published a single volume with proper copyright on behalf of Stowe and, later her estate. E. P. Dutton published the same book claiming it was in the public domain and the court agreed.

This case shared its reasoning with the previous case Mifflin v. R. H. White Company.

References

External links
 

1903 in United States case law
United States Supreme Court cases
United States Supreme Court cases of the Fuller Court
The Atlantic (magazine)
Houghton Mifflin Harcourt
E. P. Dutton
United States copyright case law
Harriet Beecher Stowe